August "Gus" Voerg (June 7, 1870 – April 21, 1944), also known as Gustav Voerg, was an American rower who competed in the 1904 Summer Olympics.

In 1904 he was part of the American boat which won the bronze medal in the coxless four.

References
Citations

Sources
 Profile at databaseOlympics.com

1870 births
1944 deaths
American male rowers
Rowers at the 1904 Summer Olympics
Olympic bronze medalists for the United States in rowing
Medalists at the 1904 Summer Olympics